Chorotypidae is a family of tropical Asian grasshoppers (order Orthoptera), formerly included within the family Eumastacidae. These grasshoppers have a head that rises above the level of the thorax and short antennae. Some species have reduced wings, others have wings that widen towards the tips and still others have a flattened leaf-like shape. They lack abdominal tympani (hearing organs).

Subfamilies and Genera 
The Orthoptera Species File lists the following:

Chininae 
Chininae  - China, Indo-China
 China 
 Eupatrides

Chorotypinae  
Auth. Stål 1873 - Asia, Southeast Asia, Central Africa

 Burrinia Bolívar, 1930
 Chorotypus Serville, 1838
 Hemierianthus Saussure, 1903
 Orchetypus Brunner von Wattenwyl, 1898
 Phyllochoreia Westwood, 1839
 Pseudorchetypus Descamps, 1974
 Scirtotypus Brunner von Wattenwyl, 1898
 Xiphicera Lamarck, 1817: Xiphicera gallinacea (Fabricius, 1793)

Erianthinae  
Auth. Karsch 1889 - Southeast Asia, South Asia

 Bennia Burr, 1899
 Bornerianthus Descamps, 1975
 Butania Bolívar, 1903
 Erianthella Descamps, 1975
 Erianthina Descamps, 1975
 Erianthus Stål, 1875
 Khaserianthus Descamps, 1975
 Macroerianthus Descamps, 1975
 Pieltainerianthus Descamps, 1975
 Pseuderianthus Descamps, 1975
 Stenerianthus Descamps, 1975 - monotypic Stenerianthus annamensis Descamps, 1975 
 Xenerianthus Descamps, 1975

Eruciinae  
Auth. Burr 1899 - Southeast Asia

 Erucius Stål, 1875

Mnesicleinae  
Auth. Descamps 1973 - Indo-Malayan Archipelago
 Adrapetes Karsch, 1889
 Borneacridium Kevan, 1963
 Chromomnesicles Descamps, 1974
 Hyalomnesicles Descamps, 1974
 Karnydia Bolívar, 1930
 Lobiacris Descamps, 1974
 Loximnesicles Descamps, 1974
 Mnesicles Stål, 1878
 Mnesiclesiella Descamps, 1974
 Mnesiclesina Descamps, 1974
 Odontomastax Bolívar, 1944
 Paramnesicles Descamps, 1974
 Philippinacridium Descamps, 1974
 Pseudomnesicles Descamps, 1974
 Samariella Descamps, 1974
 Sibuyania Descamps, 1974
 Tuberomastax Bolívar, 1944
 Uvarovia Bolívar, 1930
 Xenomnesicles Descamps, 1974

Prionacanthinae  
Auth. Descamps 1973 -  India
 Prionacantha Henry, 1940

References

External links
 
 
Orthoptera database

 
Orthoptera families
Taxa named by Carl Stål